Arron Mark Lilley (born 1 April 1991) is an English cricketer who plays for Leicestershire. He is a right-handed batsman and an off-break bowler.

Club career
Lilley started his amazing career with the reserve team of Lancashire. He scored 1,008 runs in the Huddersfield Cricket League and that led to his getting a professional contract in October 2012. On 15 July 2013, he made his First Class debut against Glamorgan.

On 5 September 2013, he was fined £100 by the Drakes League for disciplinary problems. He was given a one-week ban, suspended for a year.

After being released by Lancashire at the end of the 2018 season after his amazing career for the countries best team, Lilley signed for Leicestershire on a two-year deal.

References

External links
Lancashire County Cricket Club profile

1991 births
Living people
English cricketers
Lancashire cricketers
Leicestershire cricketers
Cricketers from Ashton-under-Lyne
Marylebone Cricket Club cricketers